Genoplesium morrisii, commonly known as the bearded midge orchid and known as Corunastylis morrisii in Australia, is a small terrestrial orchid endemic to south-eastern Australia. It has a single thin leaf fused to the flowering stem and up to fifteen small, dark purplish-black or green and purple flowers.

Description
The sides of the labellum are lines with many coarse, spreading cilia and there is a narrow oblong callus in the centre of the labellum and extending about half way to its tip. Flowering occurs between January and April.

Taxonomy and naming
The bearded midge orchid was first formally described in 1931 by William Henry Nicholls who gave it the name Prasophyllum morrisii and published the description in The Victorian Naturalist. In 1989, David Jones and Mark Clements changed the name to Genoplesium morrisii and in 2002 changed the name again to Corunastylis morrisii. The specific epithet (morrisii) honours "Mr. P.F. Morris of the National Herbarium, whose name I have bestowed upon this dainty little species".

Distribution and habitat
Genoplesium morrisii grows in forest, woodland and heath and is widespread and common in the southern half of Victoria. It is rarely encountered in Tasmania and possibly grows in the far south-east of New South Wales.

Conservation
Corunastylis morrisii is classed as "Endangered" under the Tasmanian Threatened Species Protection Act 1995. It is only known from a few near-coastal areas in the north and south where fewer than 100 mature plants are thought to survive. The main threats to the species in Tasmania are land clearing, inappropriate fire regimes and inappropriate disturbance.

References

External links
 
 

morrisii
Endemic orchids of Australia
Orchids of New South Wales
Orchids of Tasmania
Orchids of Victoria (Australia)
Plants described in 1931